Uzmani ( or ; in older sources also Uzmane) is a settlement west of Rob in the Municipality of Velike Lašče in central Slovenia. It lies just off the road leading from Rob to Krvava Peč. The entire municipality is part of the traditional region of Lower Carniola and is now included in the Central Slovenia Statistical Region.

References

External links
Uzmani on Geopedia

Populated places in the Municipality of Velike Lašče